Safefood, stylised safefood (also known as The Food Safety Promotion Board; FSPB)(Ulster-Scots: Tha Mait Safétie Fordèrin Boord or The Meat Sauftie Forder Buird), is the public body responsible for raising consumer awareness of issues relating to food safety and healthy eating across the Ireland and Northern Ireland. Founded in 1999, Safefood is one of six North-South implementation bodies established jointly by the British and Irish governments under the terms of the British-Irish Agreement Act.

Safefood's headquarters are in Little Island, Cork, with a second office in Dublin City centre.

Structure
Safefood is a multi-directorate organisation. The chief executive is guided by a twelve-member Advisory Board and a thirteen-member Scientific Advisory Committee (SAC), and takes policy direction from the North-South Ministerial Council (NSMC).

Function
Its functions, as proscribed in law (British Irish Agreement Act 1999, annex I, part 2), are:
Promotion of food safety
Research into food safety
Communication of food alerts
Surveillance of foodborne disease
Promotion of scientific co-operation and laboratory linkages
Development of cost-effective facilities for specialised laboratory testing.

Activities
Safefood is a multidisciplinary organisation employing expertise in both food science and nutrition. The body's research, educational, and promotional activities center on the subjects of food safety and healthy eating and are delivered via media campaigns (e.g. television and radio advertisements and social media) and the publication of information resources for consumers and other stakeholders.

Examples of Safefood consumer campaigns on tackling excess weight and obesity amongst adults include Stop the Spread and Weigh-2-Live, while safefood's If you Could see the Germs Spread campaign aims to raise awareness amongst consumers of the health risks associated with poor food hygiene practices in the home.

Further reading
 Citizens' Information
 The North-South Ministerial Council

References 

British–Irish Agreement implementation bodies
Food safety organizations
Medical and health organisations based in the Republic of Ireland